Sergio Marchi (born 22 May 1920 – 16 December 1979) was an Italian professional footballer who played as a defender.

External links
 

1920 births
1979 deaths
Italian footballers
Italy international footballers
Serie A players
Pisa S.C. players
Genoa C.F.C. players
A.C. Milan players
Inter Milan players
Cagliari Calcio players
Association football defenders
Sportspeople from Pisa
Footballers from Tuscany